Ludovic Lidon (born February 6, 1971 in Tours, France) is a former professional footballer who played as a central defender.

External links
Ludovic Lidon profile at chamoisfc79.fr

1971 births
Living people
French footballers
French football managers
Association football defenders
Chamois Niortais F.C. players
Ligue 2 players
SO Romorantin players
Sportspeople from Tours, France

Association football midfielders
Footballers from Centre-Val de Loire